The 2009 FIM Speedway World Championship Grand Prix of Latvia was the sixth race of the 2009 Speedway Grand Prix season. It took place on 1 August in the Latvijas Spidveja Centrs in Daugavpils, Latvia.

The Latvian Grand Prix was won by American Greg Hancock, who beat Kenneth Bjerre, Tomasz Gollob and GP leader Jason Crump in the final.

Riders 

2008 World Champion Nicki Pedersen was injured at 2009 Speedway World Cup Event 1 (undergoing skin graft surgery on burns to his left leg). On Monday 20 July he had an operation. Pedersen said, "The wounds need to be completely healed before I get back on the bike, otherwise I could risk having problems for the rest of the season". At the Latvia SGP Pedersen will be replaced by first Qualified Substitutes Niels Kristian Iversen, Dane also. The Speedway Grand Prix Commission nominated Grigory Laguta as a Wild Card, and Maksims Bogdanovs and Vjačeslavs Giruckis, both as Track Reserve. The riders' starting positions draw for Grand Prix meeting was made on 31 July by Jānis Lāčplēsis, the President of Latvian Track Racing Commission.

 Draw Nr 1 change:  (1) Nicki Pedersen →  (19) Niels Kristian Iversen

Heat details

Heat after heat 
 Adams, Sayfutdinov, Crump, Iversen
 Ułamek, Lindgren, Bjerre, Andersen
 Laguta, Holta, Harris, Nicholls
 Gollob, Jonsson, Hancock, Walasek
 Jonsson, Harris, Lindgren, Iversen
 Hancock, Andersen, Laguta, Crump
 Bjerre, Gollob, Sayfutdinov, Nicholls
 Walasek, Adams, Holta, Ułamek
 Andersen, Iversen, Nicholls, Walasek
 Crump, Holta, Gollob, Lindgren
 Hancock, Ułamek, Sayfutdinov, Harris
 Bjerre, Adams, Laguta, Jonsson
 Iversen, Hancock, Holta, Bjerre
 Crump, Nicholls, Jonsson, Ułamek
 Sayfutdinov, Lindgren, Laguta, Walasek
 Gollob, Harris, Andersen, Adams
 Iversen, Gollob, Ułamek, Laguta (X)
 Walasek, Bjerre, Crump, Harris
 Andersen, Sayfutdinov, Holta, Jonsson
 Adams, Hancock, Lindgren, Nicholls
 Semi-Finals:
 Gollob, Bjerre, Sajfutdinov, Iversen
 Hancock, Crump, Adams, Andersen
 The Final:
 Hancock (6 pts), Bjerre (4 pts), Gollob (2 pts), Crump (0 pts)

The intermediate classification

See also 
 Speedway Grand Prix
 List of Speedway Grand Prix riders

References

External links 
 FIM-live.com 

L
2009
Speedway